David Hall is an Irish businessman and campaigner.

Hall is currently best known as the owner of Lifeline Ambulance Services  and chief executive officer of the Irish Mortgage Holders Organisation and cofounder of iCare Housing.

Hall is also the former interim CEO of the former scandal hit charity Console.

Hall studied at St. Patrick's College, Maynooth where he was elected Students Union, Vice-President in 1990. In 2013, he unsuccessfully took the government to court over the issuing and payment of promissory notes, which he appealed to the Supreme Court of Ireland.

Hall owns and runs the Lifeline ambulance service. He founded the Make a Wish Foundation Ireland in 1992, and also served as chairman of the Marie Keating Foundation.

In 2005 Hall was involved in a blackmail scandal. A clip, shot on a mobile phone, shows Hall saying ”everyone should have one”. Asked what he means, he says “blacks”.  Hall stated that the clip was taken completely out of context, and that the conversation was “banter between friends”.

In 2009 Hall founded New Beginnings along with lawyers Ross Maguire and Vincent Martin, to campaign and fight for those in mortgage arrears.  David Hall left the organisation in July 2012 over differences with the commercial route being taken.  and in 2012, David founded the Irish Mortgage Holders Organisation.

Hall unsuccessfully ran as an Independent in the 2014 by-election in Dublin West. After controversies over its founder and CEO Paul Kelly, the board of Console appointed Hall as its Interim CEO. In 2017, Hall was appointed to the Venerable Order of St. John by Queen Elizabeth II in recognition of his charitable works and contribution to society.

In 2017 Hall co-founded an approved housing body iCare Housing who provide social housing for people who cannot afford to provide a home for themselves.

Revenue tax default
In 2016 whistleblowers accused David Hall and Life Line Ambulance Services of 'serious wrongdoing' and claimed unfair dismissal and were the first employees to ever win court protection under the whistleblower protection legislation Mick Dougan and Sean Clarke claimed they were made redundant for making a protected disclosure to Revenue about the company in January of 2015.

In March 2020 it was revealed that Life Line Ambulance Service, to which "Self-promoter extraordinaire, " Hero without a cape" David Hall" is a director was found after an audit to owe Revenue €416,965, including interest and penalties, for under-declaration of PAYE, PRSI, and USC.

References

Living people

Year of birth missing (living people)
Alumni of St Patrick's College, Maynooth

Irish businesspeople